La Biblia en pasta (Spanish for "The Bible in pulp paper", a Spanish idiom for something hard and difficult) is a 1984 Spanish comedy film directed by Manuel Summers.  It is a humorous version of some episodes from the Old Testament.

Plot
The film shows a humorous version of four episodes of Genesis: Adam and Eve, Cain and Abel, the Flood and the Tower of Babel, also Abraham appears very briefly at the end. There are many anachronisms for humorous purposes, such as Noah's Ark having windscreen wipers or Cain singing the Internationale and absurd jokes such as Noah painting stripes on a white horse to hide not having a zebra.

Critic
Spanish critic Carlos Aguilar in his Guía del cine español considers this film "painful".

References

External links
 

Spanish comedy films
1984 films
Films based on the Book of Genesis
Cultural depictions of Adam and Eve
Noah's Ark in film
1984 comedy films
Films directed by Manuel Summers
1980s Spanish films